I Dont Know How But They Found Me (stylized in all caps), often shortened to IDKHow (stylized as iDKHOW), is an American duo based in Salt Lake City, Utah, and formed in 2016. It consists of lead vocalist and bassist Dallon Weekes and drummer Ryan Seaman. Before signing with Fearless Records, the duo was described as "the hottest unsigned band in the world" on the cover of Rock Sound in March 2018.

History

Formation and secrecy (2016–2017) 
Prior to the formation of the band, Dallon Weekes and Ryan Seaman were longtime friends who had worked together in the past. Seaman joined Weekes' former band The Brobecks in 2008 and played drums for Weekes' solo projects, including the songs "Sickly Sweet Holidays" and "Please Don't Jump (It's Christmas)."

Initially a solo act, Weekes had been writing and recording songs for several years while on the road with Panic! at the Disco. Seaman performed drums on these songs, which eventually became their debut EP 1981 Extended Play, and Weekes proposed that they present themselves as a duo.

As evidenced by old tweets and Weekes confirming it in interviews, the "I Dont Know How But They Found Me" moniker and project idea has existed since 2009. Uniquely, the punctuation of the band name is intentionally incorrect, with no apostrophe in "don't" and no comma after "how." Weekes credited it to his time in Panic! at the Disco, stating that "punctuation was a big deal [in the band], so I just wanted to take the opposite approach and get rid of it all." The band's name was inspired by a quote from the movie Back to the Future.

Weekes and Seaman began secretly performing in small venues from late 2016 to mid-2017. They debuted at Emo Nite Los Angeles' 2-year anniversary event on December 6, 2016. After the show, different sources wrote about a "new side project" by Weekes and Seaman and confirmed the band name. Even when confronted with photos and videos taken at the shows, Weekes and Seaman denied the whole project for months. Weekes later stated that they did not want to exploit his and Seaman's name recognition and association with the well-known bands they played in. Seaman would depart his band Falling in Reverse in May 2017, followed by Weekes leaving Panic! at the Disco in December.

Touring and 1981 Extended Play (2017–2020) 
The duo teased the release of their first song "Modern Day Cain" one day prior with a post on their Instagram account. On August 18, 2017 the full song was self-released on iTunes and Spotify and followed up with a music video on the same day. The single reached number 8 of the Top 10 Alternative Music Charts on iTunes on the day of release. The duo's second single "Choke" was released on October 26, 2017. It was again self-published and accompanied by a lyric video. The single peaked at number 7 of the iTunes Top 100 Alternative Music Charts. The band went on a few short tours between July and December 2017, playing shows in Utah, California and neighboring states, as well as one show in New York. They also performed as the opening act for The Aquabats and Dashboard Confessional. On March 14, 2018 they released the song "Nobody Likes The Opening Band" as a free download on their website accompanied with a music video. On March 28, it was announced that the band would perform at the Reading and Leeds Festivals.

On August 24, the duo re-released "Choke" alongside a new song titled "Do It All The Time" as a double A-side single via Fearless Records. In October, the duo announced their debut EP titled 1981 Extended Play, with a release date of November 9. Later that month, they released a single from the EP titled "Bleed Magic". Upon its release, the EP topped the US Billboard Heatseekers chart. In March, 2019, the duo announced "Night Heat", a headlining tour consisting of 17 stops across North America as well as music festivals from April 28th to May 18th with the band Superet supporting headlining dates.

On April 26, 2019, the duo released the single "Choke (Acoustic)" which features a cabaret style version of their hit single. The band also released a Christmas EP titled Christmas Drag on November 15, 2019, which includes a cover of "Merry Christmas Everybody". This was followed by three music videos, one for each song on the EP.

Razzmatazz (2020–present) 
On August 5, 2020, the band released a lyric video for the single "Leave Me Alone" and announced the coming release of their debut album, Razzmatazz. On September 16, the title track "Razzmatazz" was released, along with a lyric video. On October 2, "New Invention" and an accompanying lyric video were released. The album was released on October 23, 2020. On January 25, 2021, the band made their national television debut on Jimmy Kimmel Live!, performing "Leave Me Alone". The band followed up with a performance on The Ellen DeGeneres Show on February 23, as well as releasing a new single, a recording of the Beck song "Debra", which they've played during live shows. They also performed their songs "New Invention" and "Kiss Goodnight" for the first time on live television for CBS This Morning's Saturday Sessions.
On June 11, 2021, the band released a new single called "Mx. Sinister" which was previously performed live under the title "Mr. Sinister." The band had their first show since the Covid-19 pandemic began at Utah’s Forkfest Festival in June, and then continued to do 4 headlining dates in the UK in August, including sold-out shows at Glasgow’s SWG3 and London’s Kentish Town Forum, and a set on the Main Stage of the Reading and Leeds Festivals. The band then announced the Razzmatazzmatour, which ran from November 2 - November 20, 2021, as well as the Thought Reform Tour, which ran from January 18 - February 26, 2022. On November 5, 2021, the band released a remix of "New Invention" featuring Tessa Violet. On November 18, 2021, the band released a deluxe version of Razzmatazz with 7 additional tracks, including a cover of The Cure song "Boys Don't Cry", the demo version of "From The Gallows", and live renditions of "Sugar Pills" and "Leave Me Alone". On May 31, 2022, the band announced The Welcome to Hellvetica Tour, a North American co-headlining tour with Joywave.

Tours 
 Content Tour (2018)
 Entertainment Tour: North America (2018; as supporting act for Waterparks)
 Night Heat Tour (2019)
 Silversun Pickups Tour (2019; as supporting act for Silversun Pickups)
 Razzmatazzmatour (2021)
 Thought Reform Tour (2022)
 Welcome to Hellvetica Tour (2022; co-headlining with Joywave)

Musical style and influences 
Their style has mainly been described as indie pop. Weekes himself also described their musical style as indie pop, as well as "hipster nonsense" and "Glam Wham". The band has also been described as new wave, alternative, electronic rock, "electro pop rock", and a pop rock-influenced mix of "sixties garage, seventies glam, eighties new wave, and the early days of Britpop".

On its website the band describes itself as "...a band out of time. One who faded away into obscurity after struggling to find success in the late 70's and early 80's". The duo's music, as well as their appearance and social media presence, is strongly influenced by the style of the 1980s; Weekes has stated that he draws inspiration from the pop culture of the time.

Among others, Weekes has named Marc Bolan, David Bowie, Oingo Boingo, Elvis Costello, The Ink Spots, and Joe Jackson as musical influences for the band's sound.

Band members 
Current members
 Dallon Weekes – lead vocals, bass, guitar, synthesizers, piano, ukulele, production (2016–present)
 Ryan Seaman – drums, percussion, backing vocals (2016–present)

Touring members
 Anthony Purpura – guitar, keys, backing vocals (2021–present)

Discography 

Studio albums
 Razzmatazz (2020)

Extended Plays
 1981 Extended Play (2018)
 Christmas Drag (2019)
 Razzmatazz B-Sides (2021)

References

External links
 

Indie pop groups from Utah
Musical groups established in 2016
2016 establishments in Utah
Musical groups from Salt Lake City
Fearless Records artists